Caloote is a town and its surrounding locality on the right bank of the Murray River in the Mid Murray Council in South Australia. The southern extent of the locality is in the Rural City of Murray Bridge.

Caloote was developed as a private subdivision in 1885 by Carl C Rathmann.

A Citizens' Military Force training campsite was established at Caloote in the early 1950s.

In 2011 the population of Caloote was 273.

References 

 

Towns in South Australia